Blanche d'Antigny (9 May 1840 – 30 June 1874) was a French singer, actress and courtesan whose fame today rests chiefly on the fact that Émile Zola used her as the principal model for his novel Nana.

Life
Blanche d'Antigny was born Marie Ernestine Antigny in Martizay, France. Her father, Jean Antigny, was the sacristan at a local church. At age 14 she ran off to Bucharest with a lover whom she then abandoned for some gypsies. On her return to Paris she worked in the circus and in various dance halls. She also posed for Paul Baudry for his painting The Penitent Madeleine. She became the mistress of the Russian police chief Mesentzov who took her to St. Petersburg and, when she was forced to leave Russia by special order of the Tsarina.

When she set it into her head to become a star on the operetta stage, everything happened exactly as Zola later described it in Nana: She was an immediate success on the stage and attracted scores of wealthy lovers. Hervé brought her out as Frédégonde in Chilpéric (1868), and he went on stage to play Faust to her Marguerite in his masterpiece Le petit Faust (1869), a brilliant parody of both Goethe's play and Gounod's opera. Blanche d'Antigny played the leading roles in many of the hits of Hervé, Offenbach, and their disciples (L'œil crevé, La Vie parisienne, etc. etc.) between 1870 and 1873. Her lovers showered her with gifts and spent enormous sums of money on her, but she was unable to hold on to any of it.

After a scandal caused by the financial ruin of one of her lovers, she thought it better to leave Paris for a while. She went to Egypt where she appeared on the stage in Cairo and had an affair with the Khedive. When she was asked why she had taken along to Cairo not only her chambermaid but also her coachman, although she had neither horses nor a coach there, she is reported to have answered: What the hell! I owe Augustine 20,000 francs, and Justin 35,000; they wouldn't let me go without them! She returned from this tour infected with typhoid fever and died. Blanche d'Antigny is buried at Père Lachaise Cemetery in Paris.

References

Sources

External links
ANTIGNY Marie-Ernestine Blanche d' (1842–1874) 

1840 births
1874 deaths
People from Indre
19th-century French actresses
French stage actresses
19th-century French women singers
Burials at Père Lachaise Cemetery
Deaths from typhoid fever
Courtesans from Paris
 infectious disease deaths in France